The University of Florida Health Science Center (HSC), also known as the J. Hillis Miller Health Science Center, is the medical division of the University of Florida.

Its primary campuses are located on the university's main campus in Gainesville, Florida and at UF Health at Jacksonville in Jacksonville, Florida.  The Health Science Center comprises six colleges: Dentistry, Medicine, Nursing, Pharmacy, Public Health and Health Professions, and Veterinary Medicine.  The Gainesville campus is the only academic health center in the United States with six health-related colleges located on a single, contiguous campus.

In 2018 the Health Science Center generated over $410 Million in total research awards, and also collected over $22 Million in licensing and royalties  The HSC is affiliated with UF Health Shands Hospital in Gainesville and UF Health Jacksonville.

As of 2019 the Health Science Center enrolls 7,010 students within the six HSC academic colleges.  In addition the HSC employs over 2,400 Faculty Members, over 24,000 staff members, and over 1,200 fellows and residents.

History
The facility was named after the fourth president of the University of Florida, J. Hillis Miller Sr., who served from 1947 to 1953.  Miller spearheaded the effort to fund and build the university's College of Medicine and its teaching hospital, which were incorporated into the Health Science Center.

Divisions

Health Science Center Gainesville
Located at UF's main campus, the center encompasses:
Six health colleges:
 College of Dentistry
 College of Public Health and Health Professions
 College of Medicine
 College of Nursing
 College of Pharmacy
 College of Veterinary Medicine
Six research institutes:
 UF Health Cancer Center
 Clinical and Translational Science Institute
 Emerging Pathogens Institute
 Genetics Institute
 Institute on Aging
 McKnight Brain Institute
 Two specialty hospitals
 One teaching hospital: UF Health Shands Hospital

Health Science Center Jacksonville
Jacksonville is home to a large regional campus of UF Health, including:
 Three colleges:
 College of Medicine
 College of Nursing
 College of Pharmacy
 UF Proton Therapy Institute
 UF Health Jacksonville hospital

Facility Images

Accreditation 
The Health Science Center is accredited by the Commission on Colleges of the Southern Association of Colleges and Schools to award baccalaureate, master and doctoral degrees. Each of the professional colleges or programs is accredited by the appropriate agency for the profession or program.

See also
Buildings at the University of Florida
J. Hillis Miller Sr.
McKnight Brain Institute
University of Florida Cancer Hospital
University of Florida Health

References

External links
J. Hillis Miller Health Science Center Website
Virtual Tour of the facility
About the Health Science Center
Newsclips of the HSC
Alligator Story about the HSC
Gainesville Sun article about the HSC

Buildings and structures in Gainesville, Florida
Hospitals in the Jacksonville metropolitan area
University of Florida
Universities and colleges in the Jacksonville metropolitan area
1956 establishments in Florida